The 2019–20 season is Grimsby Town's 142nd season of existence and their fourth consecutive season in League Two. Along with competing in League Two, the club will also participate in the FA Cup, EFL Cup and EFL Trophy.

The season covers the period from 1 July 2019 to 30 June 2020.

Transfers

Transfers in

Loans in

Loans out

Transfers out

Pre-season
Grimsby revealed their pre-season programme in June 2019.

First Team Squad

 Players' ages are as of the opening day of the 2019–20 season (Friday 2 August).

Competitions

League Two

League table

Results summary

Results by matchday

Matches
On Thursday, 20 June 2019, the EFL League Two fixtures were revealed.

FA Cup

The first round draw was made on 21 October 2019.

EFL Cup

The first round draw was made on 20 June. The second round draw was made on 13 August 2019 following the conclusion of all but one first round matches. The third round draw was confirmed on 28 August 2019, live on Sky Sports.

EFL Trophy

On 9 July 2019, the pre-determined group stage draw was announced with Invited clubs to be drawn on 12 July 2019.

References

Grimsby Town F.C. seasons
Grimsby Town